is a passenger railway station located in the city of Hidaka, Saitama, Japan, operated by the East Japan Railway Company (JR East).

Lines

Station layout

The station has an elevated concourse connecting the north and south sides of the station. The tracks are at ground level, with a single island platform serving two tracks. Many trains cross here on the otherwise single-track line. The station is staffed.

Platforms

Facilities and accessibility
The station has escalator access to the platforms from the overhead concourse, and has universal access toilets.

History
The station opened on 22 July 1940 in what was then the village of Takahagi. On 1 June 1985, the village of Takahagi was merged to become part of the town of Hidaka. This was upgraded to become a city on 1 October 1991. With the privatization of JNR on 1 April 1987, the station came under the control of JR East.

A new elevated station building was opened on 19 February 2005.

Passenger statistics
In fiscal 2019, the station was used by an average of 3442 passengers daily (boarding passengers only).

Surrounding area
 
 Saitama Women's Junior College
 Hidaka High School
 Takahagi Junior High School
 Takahagi Kita Junior High School
 Takahagi Elementary School
 Takahagi Kita Elementary School

See also
 List of railway stations in Japan

References

External links

 Musashi-Takahagi Station information (JR East) 
 Musashi-Takahagi Station information (Saitama Prefectural Government) 
 Hidaka City information on station rebuilding 

Railway stations in Japan opened in 1940
Kawagoe Line
Stations of East Japan Railway Company
Railway stations in Saitama Prefecture
Hidaka, Saitama